Amar Rahe Yeh Pyar is a 1961 Hindi/Urdu family drama film directed by Prabhu Dayal. Produced by Radha Kishan and Prabhu Dayal (R. P. Films), it had music by C. Ramchandra. The story, screenplay and dialogues were by written by Radha Kishan.
The film starred Nalini Jaywant, Rajendra Kumar, Nanda, Honey Irani and Prabhu Dayal.

Set against the backdrop of the partition (1947), it's the story of a widow who is given an infant to look after, only to have the real mother come five years later to claim it as her own.

Plot
Geeta and Kishan are a happily married couple and expecting their first child. Kishan works with a contractor, Thomas, driving a truck to work. One day, he meets with an accident and dies. The grief makes Geeta lose her baby. Geeta is inconsolable and her brother Sewakram tries his best to help her mourn and deal with her sorrow. He finds an abandoned infant and brings him to Geeta, hoping that by caring for him her maternal instincts will ease the pain. It's 1947 and communal riots have spread all over the city. Advocate Iqbal Hussain and his wife Razia, had left India for the newly formed Pakistan, but due to unforeseen circumstances, their infant boy was left behind. After five years spent in anguish over their missing son, Razia and Iqbal come back to India to look for their son. Eventually, they trace him to Geeta. The boy and mother refuse to be parted, but it is imposed on Geeta to give up the boy. Razia is unable to see the misery the parting is causing her son and Geeta. She makes the final sacrifice and returns with her husband to Pakistan, having left the boy behind in India with Geeta.

Cast
 Rajendra Kumar as Advocate Iqbal Hussain
 Nanda as Razia Hussain
 Nalini Jaywant as Geeta
 Chandan Kumar as Kishan
 Radha Kishan as Sewakram
 Honey Irani
 Tiwari as Bahadur
 Narbada Shankar
 Sarita
 S. Nazir

Music
The music composer was C. Ramchandra and the songs were written by Kavi Pradeep. Asha Bhosle and Suman Kalyanpur provided the female playback for the songs. The male singer was Pradeep, who wrote strongly about the communal violence in his lyrics, with his "raw" voice matching the pathos required.
According to one source, a song written by Pradeep, "Hai, Yeh Siyasat Kitni Gandi" (Alas! How Dirty Are The Politics of the Time), critical of the establishment, was censored from the film.

Song List

References

External links
 

1961 films
1960s Hindi-language films
Films set in the partition of India
Films scored by C. Ramchandra